Theodore Roosevelt Dam is a dam on the Salt River located northeast of Phoenix, Arizona. Originally built between 1905 and 1911, the dam was renovated and expanded in 1989–1996. The dam is named after President Theodore Roosevelt. Serving mainly for irrigation, water supply, and flood control, the dam also has a hydroelectric generating capacity of 36 megawatts.

History 

In 1888, Billy Breakenridge became surveyor for Maricopa County. He surveyed the Salt River for potential dam sites and in July 1889, he traveled with James McClintock, William J. Murphy, and John R. Norton to choose the best location. After a week on horseback, they reached Box Canyon, near the confluence of Tonto Creek and the Salt River. They recommended the location as the best site for a dam.

One of the original five federal projects authorized on March 14, 1903, under the Newlands Reclamation Act of 1902, Roosevelt Dam was the first major project to be completed under the new federal reclamation program. This, one of the world's highest masonry dams, was started in 1906 and opened by President Theodore Roosevelt on March 18, 1911. The beginning of federal production of electric power occurred at Roosevelt Dam when Congress, in 1906, authorized the Reclamation Service to develop and sell hydroelectric power at the Salt River Project.

The Reclamation Act of 1902 created the United States Reclamation Service whose purpose was to design and construct irrigation projects to aid the settlement of the arid west. Previous efforts by individuals and private irrigation companies were inadequate and often unsuccessful. With the creation of the Reclamation Service, the lead role of the federal government in developing large-scale irrigation projects was firmly established.

Construction on Roosevelt Dam began in 1903 just below the confluence of Tonto Creek and the Salt River. The primary purpose of the project was to provide water storage for the Salt River Project and flood control through the Salt River Valley. The dam was finished in 1911 after several devastating floods had interrupted the construction progress in 1905. Completed at a cost of $10 million, it was the largest masonry dam in the world for its time, surpassing the 135-foot Lake Hemet Dam with a height of 280 feet (84 m) and a length of 723 feet (216 m), while Roosevelt Lake was for a time the world's largest artificial reservoir. The dam was originally known as "Salt River Dam #1", it was not until 1959 that the dam and reservoir were officially named after Theodore Roosevelt.

Roosevelt Dam, as originally conceived and built, was a symbol of success and a showpiece for the new agency. The dam contributed more than any other dam in Arizona to the settlement of Central Arizona and to the development of large-scale irrigation there. A secondary purpose of the dam was to generate a moderate amount of hydroelectric power.

The dam was listed as a National Historic Landmark in 1963, but was withdrawn from the list in 1999.

Later expansion
In 1989, an ambitious expansion and renovation project was begun at Roosevelt Dam. The dam was resurfaced with concrete by J.A. Jones Construction Company, and its height was raised 77 feet (23 m) to 357 feet (109 m), which had the effect of increasing the storage capacity of Roosevelt Lake by roughly 20%. This project was completed in 1996 at a cost of $430 million. The $430 million in costs included three other major construction contracts associated with the dam. These included the realignment of Highway 188 over the new Theodore Roosevelt Lake Bridge upstream of the dam, renovations to the hydroelectric power plant, and a tunneling contract known as the "Lake Tap". The Lake Tap contract would provide locations where the penstocks would be located to bring water into the hydroelectric power plant. Shortly after completion, however, the area entered into a prolonged period of drought, and it would be some time before the newly increased capacity was put to use, with the lake finally reaching historic levels of 100% capacity in February 2009.

As a result of the reconstruction, the dam has a completely altered appearance from when it was originally listed as a National Historic Landmark. Since the dam no longer had the integrity of the design, materials, workmanship, feeling, or association that it had when it was originally listed, the National Historic Landmark designation was withdrawn on March 10, 1999. The Theodore Roosevelt Dam National Register District contains other resources that are listed on the National Register of Historic Places, but the dam itself is no longer a contributing property to the district.

Gallery

References

External links

 SRP Water Operations: Theodore Roosevelt Dam
 
 
 
 Roosevelt Dam & The Apache Trail

Dams in Arizona
Hydroelectric power plants in Arizona
Former National Historic Landmarks of the United States
Buildings and structures in Gila County, Arizona
Buildings and structures in Maricopa County, Arizona
United States Bureau of Reclamation dams
Dams completed in 1911
Dams on the Salt River (Arizona)
Historic American Engineering Record in Arizona
1911 establishments in Arizona Territory
Masonry dams